The following is the standings of the 2005–06 Azadegan League football season.

Standings

Group A

Group B

Second place playoff 
June 1, Naghsh-e-Jahan Stadium, Isfahan

Homa In Promotion playoffs.

Second round
First leg to be played May 26, 2006 in Iran Khodro Stadium ; return leg to be played June 2, 2006 in Azodi Stadium.

 (P) Paykan Promoted  to 2006–07 Persian Gulf Cup.

First leg to be played June 2, 2006 in Kiyani Stadium; return leg to be played June 11, 2006 in Homa Stadium

 (P) Mes Kerman Promoted  to 2006–07 Persian Gulf Cup.

Final 

First leg to be played June 18, 2006 in Kiyani Stadium

1 Scheduled for June 18, Kerman between Mes Kerman and Paykan Tehran, however, Paykan did not show up, Mes Kerman awarded championship.

Relegation playoff 
May 21, Naghsh-e-Jahan Stadium, Isfahan

 (R) Deihim Ahvaz Relegated to 2nd Division.

Top goal scorers

14
  Hossein Abdi (Sanaye Arak)
13
  Babak Hatami (Mes)

Final results 
Azadegan League champions : Mes Kerman
Relegated : Bargh Tehran, Deihim Ahvaz, Iranjavan Bushehr, Shahrdari Langrud
Promoted : Mes Kerman, Paykan
Top goal scorers: Hossein Abadi (Sanaye Arak) 15 Goals (Group A) & Babak Hatami (Mes Kerman) 13 Goals (Group B)

Azadegan League seasons
Iran
2005–06 in Iranian football leagues